Western Tool Works was a pioneering brass era automobile manufacturer in Galesburg, Illinois. The company made Gale automobiles from 1904 to 1910. Early Gale runabouts were notable for having bodywork hinged at the rear of the car that could be lifted to ease access to the engine, essentially making the entire body the hood.

In 1905 Western produced the Gale Model A runabout for sale at US$500. This was less expensive than the high-volume Oldsmobile Runabout at US$650, the 2-seat Ford Model C "Doctor's Car" at US$850, or the Holsman high wheeler, but more expensive than the Black at $375, and the Success at US$250.

The Model A came standard with a  water-cooled engine mounted beneath the tilting body, chain drive,  elliptic springs,  spoke wheels with tube tires, and repair kit.

The same year, Western offered the US$650 Gale Model B. Its water-cooled engine, springs, wheels, and tires had the same dimensions as those of the Model A, and it also had chain drive and a repair kit. It offered available leather buggy top, clincher tires, horn, and brass headlights.

In 1907, Western offered the  Gale Model K-7 phaeton at US$1,250.

Notes

References

See also
List of defunct United States automobile manufacturers

Defunct motor vehicle manufacturers of the United States
Motor vehicle manufacturers based in Illinois
1900s cars
History of Illinois
Defunct manufacturing companies based in Illinois